Basutoland was a British Crown colony that existed from 1884 to 1966 in present-day Lesotho, bordered with the Cape Colony, Natal Colony and Orange River Colony until 1910 and completely surrounded by South Africa from 1910. Though the Basotho (then known as Basuto) and their territory had been under British control starting in 1868 (and ruled by Cape Colony from 1871), the Cape Colony was unpopular and unable to control the territory. As a result, Basutoland was brought under direct authority of Queen Victoria, via the High Commissioner, and run by an Executive Council presided over by a series of British Resident Commissioners.

It was divided into seven administrative districts: Berea, Leribe, Maseru, Mohale's Hoek, Mafeteng, Qacha's Nek and Quthing.

Basutoland gained its independence from the United Kingdom on 4 October 1966 and was renamed the Kingdom of Lesotho.

History

Background
Between 1856 and 1868 the Basotho engaged in conflict with the Orange Free State. Their king, Moshoeshoe I, sought British protection. On 29 August 1865, he wrote to Sir Philip Wodehouse, the Governor of Cape Colony:

In July 1866, after referring to the former letter, the Chief said:

Eventually, in January 1868, the Governor received a document dated 9 December 1867, signed by the Secretary of State for the Colonies, authorizing the annexation of Basutoland to the Colony of Natal (not to the Cape as Wodehouse had wished). On 12 March 1868, a proclamation declared the Basotho to be British subjects and Basutoland to be British territory. It was not in fact annexed to Natal, as Natal attempted unsuccessfully to condition its acceptance on Basotho land being made available for European settlement; so for some time Basutoland remained under the direct authority of Wodehouse as British High Commissioner for South Africa.

Three years later, Basutoland was annexed to the Cape Colony by Act No. 12 of 1871 of the Parliament of the Cape of Good Hope, confirmed by an Order in Council of 3 November 1871. The rule of the Cape Colony then proved unpopular with the people, leading to the Basuto Gun War of 1880–1881.

By an Order in Council dated 2 February 1884, which came into force on 18 March 1884, royal assent was given to a Cape bill repealing the Act of 1871. Basutoland was thus brought under the direct authority of the Queen, with legislative and executive powers again vested in the High Commissioner.

As a Crown colony
Moshoeshoe had been succeeded as paramount chief by his son, Letsie I, and he in turn was succeeded in 1891 by Lerotholi Letsie I. These chieftains acted in concert with the British representative in the country, to whom was given the title of resident commissioner. The first commissioner was Sir Marshal James Clarke. The period of warfare over, the Basotho turned their attention more and more to agricultural pursuits and Christian missionaries entered the territory. Trade increased, and in 1891 Basutoland was admitted to the customs union, which already existed between Orange Free State, Cape Colony and British Bechuanaland. When Alfred Milner visited Basutoland in 1898, on his way to Bloemfontein, he was received by 15,000 mounted Basotho. The chiefs also attended a large meeting at Maseru. On the outbreak of the Boer War in 1899, these same chiefs proclaimed loyalty to the British Crown. They remained passive throughout the War and the neutrality of the country was respected by both armies. One chief alone sought to take advantage of the situation by disloyal action, and his offence was met by a year's imprisonment.

In pursuance of the policy of encouraging the self-governing powers of the Basotho, a national council was instituted and held its first sitting in July 1903. In August 1905 the paramount chief Lerotholi died. In early life he had distinguished himself in the wars with the Boers, and in 1880 he took an active part in the revolt against the Cape government. Since 1884 he had been a loyal supporter of the imperial authorities, and carried a reputation for high diplomatic gifts. On the 19th of September following Lerotholi's death, the national council, with the concurrence of the imperial government, elected his son Letsie II as paramount chief. The completion in October 1905 of a railway connecting Maseru with the South African railway system proved a great boon to the community. During the Bambatha Rebellion in 1906 the Basotho remained perfectly quiet.

Government

Executive branch

Basutoland's Executive Council members were the resident commissioner, who presided, three ex-officio members and four council members from the Basutoland National Council, appointed by the resident commissioner, one by the Paramount Chief and three nominated by the Council itself, selected by secret ballot.

Legislative branch

The legislative council, known as the Basutoland National Council, consisted of a non-voting President appointed by the Resident Commissioner, four official members (ex officio), twenty-two Chiefs, forty elected members elected by District Councils, and fourteen nominated members appointed by the Resident Commissioner on the nomination of the Paramount Chief. The Resident Commissioner had the right to address the council.

The Commissioner had authority to make laws by Proclamation on certain subjects, such as external affairs, defence and the public service. These matters were excluded from the powers of the National Council, but the Commissioner was required to lay a draft of any Proclamation before the council and to consider their observations. The Constitution made special provision regarding particular objections made by the council.

Paramount Chief

There was a College of Chiefs of Basutoland whose function related to matters pertaining to the offices of the Paramount Chief, Chief and Headman. Their decisions and recommendations were submitted for acceptance to the Paramount Chief. They were subject to review by the High Court.

The Constitution vested a number of functions in the Paramount Chief. In exercising these, he was required in most cases to consult either with the Executive Council or with the Resident Commissioner, a Council member of the Executive and a member of the Basotho Nation appointed by himself.

Land in Basutoland was vested by the Constitution in the Paramount Chief in trust for the Basotho Nation, subject to lawfully acquired rights.

Demographics
Considering the extensive area of uninhabitable mountain land it contained, the territory supported a mediocre population. The inhabitants increased from 128,206 in 1875, to 348,848 in 1904. Women outnumbered men by about 20,000, which was, however, about the number of adult men away from the country at any given period. The majority lived in the district between the Maloti Mountains and the Caledon River. The great bulk of the people were Basotho, but there were some thousands of Barolong and other natives. The White inhabitants in 1904 numbered 895. Maseru, the seat of government, had in 1904 a population of about 1,000 including some 100 Europeans.

Districts

 Berea District
 Leribe District
 Maseru District
 Mohales Hoek District
 Mafeteng District
 Qacha's Nek District
 Quthing District

British Resident Commissioners

Chief Justices

The Chief Justice was the Chief Justice of the High Commission Territories (Basutoland, Bechuanaland Protectorate and Swaziland). From 1951 the Chief Justices were:

References

External links

 The British Empire.co: Basutoland map room

 
History of Lesotho
Former British colonies and protectorates in Africa
Former colonies in Africa
Lesotho and the Commonwealth of Nations
States and territories established in 1884
States and territories disestablished in 1966
1884 establishments in Africa
1966 disestablishments in Africa
1884 establishments in the British Empire
1966 disestablishments in the British Empire
1966 in Lesotho
20th century in Lesotho